Malz is a German and Jewish surname. Notable people by that name include:

 Stefan Malz (born 1972), retired German footballer.
 Jakob Malz (1902–1982), German-Jewish amateur boxing champion.

See also
Maltz (disambiguation)

German culture
Jewish culture